Aymaria is a genus of South American cellar spiders that was first described by B. A. Huber in 2000.

Species
 it contains seven species, found in Ecuador, Argentina, Bolivia, and Peru:
Aymaria calilegua Huber, 2000 – Peru, Bolivia, Argentina
Aymaria conica (Banks, 1902) (type) – Ecuador (Galapagos Is.)
Aymaria dasyops (Mello-Leitão, 1947) – Bolivia
Aymaria floreana (Gertsch & Peck, 1992) – Ecuador (Galapagos Is.)
Aymaria insularis (Banks, 1902) – Ecuador (Galapagos Is.)
Aymaria jarmila (Gertsch & Peck, 1992) – Ecuador (Galapagos Is.)
Aymaria pakitza Huber, 2000 – Peru

See also
 List of Pholcidae species

References

Araneomorphae genera
Pholcidae
Spiders of South America